The Iowa Hawkeyes baseball program represents the University of Iowa in college baseball. The program started in 1890. It is a member of the Big Ten Conference and is the only NCAA Division I baseball program in the state of Iowa.

Record by year
This is a table of the Iowa Hawkeyes record year-by-year. Starting with the 1981 season the Big Ten tournament winner was declared conference champion. It also marked the first season of East and West divisions in the conference. They lasted through the 1987 season. Starting in 1993 the regular season winner was once again recognized as the conference champion. The Big Ten tournament was used to determine the NCAA automatic qualifier only.

Chicago sponsored baseball from 1896 through 1944 and again in 1946 before leaving the conference after the 1946 season. In 1951 Michigan State joined the conference, giving it ten schools sponsoring baseball. From 1896 through the 1991 season Wisconsin sponsored baseball. It dropped the sport after that season. Starting with the 1992 season Penn State joined the conference, once more bringing the conference up to ten baseball sponsoring members. In 2012 Nebraska began play in the conference, giving it 11 schools sponsoring baseball. Maryland and Rutgers joined the Big Ten as well in 2014 and participated in the 2015 season, bringing the total number of baseball programs to 13.

Head coaching history

Big Ten Conference tournaments
Iowa has made 11 appearances in the Big Ten Conference tournament. They appeared in 1983, 1987, 1989, 1990, 2002, 2005, 2007, 2010, 2015, 2016, 2017, and 2018. They have an overall record of 15–20–0, with a championship in 2017.

NCAA Tournament regional and district rounds 
The number in parentheses next to the team name represents that teams seed in the regional portion of the bracket.

NCAA College World Series

Final poll rankings
This is a table of Iowa's ranking in the Collegiate Baseball Division I Final Polls.

Big Ten 

Note: Teams in italics are no longer in the conference or no longer sponsor baseball. Records are through the end of the 2010–2011 school year. Records reflect all-time records against members, not only in conference play.

Rivals

Notable players
Mike Boddicker – Drafted in the 6th round during the 1978 January Draft by the Baltimore Orioles. Was the 1983 ALCS MVP, World Series Champion with the 1983 Orioles, 1984 All-Star and 1990 Gold Glove Award. 
Jack Bruner – Played for the Chicago White Sox and St. Louis Browns.
Tim Costo – Drafted in the 1st round (8th overall) during the 1990 MLB draft by the Cleveland Indians. Also played for the Cincinnati Reds.
Jim Cox – Drafted in the 1st round (2nd overall) during the 1972 January Secondary Draft by the Montreal Expos.
Jack Dittmer – Was named to the 1949 College Baseball All-America Team. Played for the Boston Braves/Milwaukee Braves and Detroit Tigers. Inducted into the University of Iowa Athletics Hall of Fame in 1993.
Cal Eldred – Drafted in the 1st round (17th overall) during the 1989 MLB draft by the Milwaukee Brewers. Played Major League baseball from 1991 to 2005 (15 seasons). Also played for the Chicago White Sox and St. Louis Cardinals.
Bob Gebhard – Drafted in the 44th round during the 1965 Major League Baseball draft by the Minnesota Twins. Also played for the Montreal Expos.
Chris Hatcher – Drafted in the 3rd round during the 1990 MLB draft by the Houston Astros. Also played for the Kansas City Royals and Lotte Giants of the KBO.
Bill Heckroth – First Team All-Big Ten pitcher in 1972. Served in Iowa Senate from 2007 to 2011.
Danan Hughes – Drafted in the 3rd round of the 1992 MLB draft by the Milwaukee Brewers. Also drafted in the 7th round of the 1993 NFL Draft by the Kansas City Chiefs.
Jeff Jones – Drafted in the 20th round during the 1979 MLB draft by the Cincinnati Reds.
Jim McAndrew – Drafted in the 11th round during the 1965 MLB draft by the New York Mets. World Series Champion with the 1969 Mets. Also played for the San Diego Padres. His nickname during his playing days was "The Pride of a Lost Nation, Iowa".
Wes Obermueller – Drafted in the 2nd round during the 1999 MLB draft by the Kansas City Royals. Also played for the Milwaukee Brewers, Florida Marlins, Orix Buffaloes of the NPB and Samsung Lions of the KBO.
Bo Porter – Drafted in the 40th round during the 1993 MLB draft by the Chicago Cubs. Also played for the Oakland Athletics and Texas Rangers. Manager of the Houston Astros from 2013 to 2014.
Jim Sundberg – Drafted in the 1st round (2nd overall) during the 1973 January Secondary Draft by the Texas Rangers. Was a 3× All-Star, 6× Gold Glove Award winner, World Series Champion with the 1985 Royals and in the Texas Rangers Hall of Fame. Also played for the Milwaukee Brewers and Chicago Cubs.

See also
List of NCAA Division I baseball programs

References

External links

Official website